Abu Bakarr Koroma is a Sierra Leonean born on 23rd. June 1991 (31) in a mining town called Lunsar. He is the son of father (Sorie Koroma) and Temne mother (Aminata Sankoh).

Art

Throughout his career, Biazzi has created works that appear to recover ideas and feelings which seem to be frozen in the past.  As described by Portuguese anthropologist Nuno Branco, "He (Biazzi) goes further. He lets his mind wander through a number of variations…He is a Guaraní, he is a Tehuelche, he becomes a Mataco.  No doubt his art is a process of becoming.  The way he has found of becoming someone else, of generously forgetting about himself.  The art of invocation: to invoke, to enchant, to seduce, to laugh together, united by an element of softness, are verbs featuring in his grammar and imagery, only deceptively naïve."

Recent exhibitions
1999: Centro Cultural Borges, Buenos Aires.
2001: Museo Histórico "Casa de la Mondeda", Buenos Aires. Museo de Arte "Casa de la Colonia", Esperanza, Santa Fe.
2002: Embajada de Cuba, Homenaje a Félix Coluccio, Buenos Aires.
2003:Arte Córdoba, Feria Internacional de Arte Contemporáneo, Córdoba. Mural Club Gimnasia y Esgrima, Buenos Aires.
2003: Xunta de Galicia, Casa de Galicia, Madrid, Spain.
2006: Galería de Arte Revale, Buenos Aires, Argentina
2007: Museo de Arte Contemporáneo de Salta "M.A.C", Salta, Argentina.
2007: Casa de Cultura de San Lorenzo del Escorial, Madrid, Spain.

References

External links
http://revarte.blogspot.com/2010/03/espacio-biazzi.html
http://proyectosantelmo.wordpress.com/2008/09/25/%C2%A1-gallery-nights-en-san-telmo/
http://www.biazzi.com.ar/
https://vimeo.com/38129304

Argentine painters
Argentine male painters
Living people
Year of birth missing (living people)